Arnaud Balijon (born 17 June 1983) is a French professional footballer who plays as a goalkeeper for  club Dunkerque.

Club career
On 22 June 2022, Balijon signed with Dunkerque.

References

External links
 
 Profile at L'Équipe
 Arnaud Balijon foot-national.com Profile

Living people
1983 births
Sportspeople from Reims
Association football goalkeepers
French footballers
Ligue 2 players
Championnat National players
Championnat National 2 players
Stade de Reims players
Stade Lavallois players
FC Istres players
US Orléans players
Le Havre AC players
Gazélec Ajaccio players
FC Bastia-Borgo players
USL Dunkerque players
Footballers from Grand Est